Up from the Ashes may refer to:

Music
 Up from the Ashes (Burn Halo album) (2011) or its title track
 "Up from the Ashes", a 2013 cover of the song by the Letter Black from Rebuild
 Up from the Ashes (Don Dokken album) (1990)
 Up from the Ashes (Naer Mataron album) (1998)
 "Up from the Ashes" (song), a 2020 song by Kanye West and Dr. Dre from Jesus Is King Part II
 "Up from the Ashes", a 2007 song by Brainstorm from the remaster of Hungry
 "Bu-ikikaesu!!" (ぶっ生き返す!! Up from the Ashes!!), a 2007 song by Maximum the Hormone from Bu-ikikaesu
 "Up from the Ashes", a 2016 song by Urban Rescue from Wild Heart

Other uses
 "Up from the Ashes", an episode of Tyler Perry's House of Payne

See also

 From the Ashes (disambiguation)
 Out of the Ashes (disambiguation)
 Phoenix (mythology)